Logan were a Scottish rock band, formed in 2003 in Glasgow, Scotland. The line-up consists of Kenny Collins (vocals), Max McPherson (lead guitar), Mick Coll (rhythm guitar, backing vocals) and Stef Lach (bass). They have been compared to various post-grunge bands such as Creed, Nickelback and Alter Bridge.

Logan released five studio albums – First Leaf Fallen (2003); Welcome to the Wasteland (2004); Cruel Little World (2006); Exposed (2007), and The Great Unknown (2010). Despite being unsigned, Logan have managed to sell over 30,000 albums, with two singles reaching the Top 40 in the UK Rock Singles Chart.

History
Formed in March 2003, Logan, consisting of vocalist Kenny Collins, guitarist Mick Coll, bassist Michael Wilson and drummer Martin Downes, posted demos of their music on various American music forums, gaining fans in the process. One year after forming, and after having only played one gig, Logan were invited to Washington DC to showcase for music industry heavyweight Pete Ganbarg. Upon returning to the UK, the band released their debut album entitled First Leaf Fallen and were joined on drums by Iain Stratton and added a second guitarist in the form of Al Reilly. They released their second album entitled Welcome to the Wasteland in 2005, while they toured the UK, supporting Alter Bridge. Logan continued to play shows before releasing two more albums: Cruel Little World in 2006 and Exposed 2007.

In 2008, Michael Wilson departed the band, and new bass player Steve Reilly joined the team. The band supported Bon Jovi at their Hampden Park concert, before touring the UK and supporting Alter Bridge on the UK leg of their Blackbird tour. The same year, the band contributed the song "The Great Unknown" to The Jump-Off soundtrack and The Scotsman named them one of the best unsigned bands.

The band played a number of Scottish shows in March 2009 before playing two shows supporting Thunder, on their 20 Years and Out farewell tour, in July. They also played at Download Festival. Logan won the Scottish Variety Award for Best New Scottish Band the same year.

They released their new album entitled The Great Unknown in 2010.

In July 2012, Logan announced via their Facebook page that guitarist Alan Reilly, bassist Steve Reilly and drummer Iain Stratton were no longer in the band, leaving founding members Kenny Collins and Mick Coll to continue building their legacy and recruit new members. In September 2012, Logan revealed that their new lead guitarist was Max McPherson. In October 2012, they announced UK Young drummer of the Year Calum Blair as their new drummer and Stef Lach as their new bass player. The group disbanded in 2014. Due to arguments over royalties and rights their songs are no longer available for public performances and they have been removed from all major streaming platforms

Band members
Mick Coll – rhythm guitar, backing vocals
Kenny Collins – lead vocals
Stef Lach – bass 
Max McPherson – lead guitar 
Alan Reilly – lead guitar 
Michael Wilson – bass 
Steve Reilly – bass 
Martin Downes – drums 
Iain Stratton – drums, percussion 
Calum Blair – drums

Discography

Studio albums

Compilation albums

Singles

Music videos

References

External links

Musical groups established in 2003
Musical groups from Glasgow
Musical quintets
Scottish hard rock musical groups
British post-grunge groups